Laphria felis is a species of robber flies in the family Asilidae.

References

felis
Articles created by Qbugbot
Taxa named by Carl Robert Osten-Sacken